The 1962 All-East football team consists of American football players chosen by various selectors as the best players at each position among the Eastern colleges and universities during the 1962 NCAA University Division football season.

Backs  
 Bill King, Dartmouth (AP-1)
 Roger Kochman, Penn State (AP-1)
 Paul Martha, Pittsburgh (AP-1)
 Rick Leeson, Pittsburgh (AP-1)

Ends 
 Dave Robinson, Penn State (AP-1)
 Art Graham, Boston College (AP-1)

Tackles 
 Ron Testa, Navy (AP-1)
 Chuck Sieminski, Penn State (AP-1)

Guards 
 Dick Nowak, Army (AP-1)
 Hatch Rosdahl, Penn State (AP-1)

Center 
 Don McKinnon, Dartmouth (AP-1)

Key
 AP = Associated Press
 UPI = United Press International

See also
 1962 College Football All-America Team

References

All-Eastern
All-Eastern college football teams